Grodzhisk is a Hasidic dynasty founded by Rebbe Elimelech Szapira, author of Imrei Elimelech.

Grodzhisk is the Yiddish name of Grodzisk Mazowiecki, a town in present-day Poland.

Lineage 

 Rabbi Elimelech Szapira of Grodzhisk (b. 1823, d. 29 March 1892).
 Rabbi Yisroel Szapira. son of Rabbi Elimelech Szapira.
 Rabbi Chayim Myer Yechiel Szapira, son of Rabbi Elimelech Szapira.
 Rabbi Yisroel Shapira (killed at Treblinka, 1942), son of Rabbi Chayim Myer Yechiel.
 Rabbi Avraham Elimelech Szapira (d. Dec. 6, 1966), son of Rabbi Yisroel Shapira.
 Rabbi Kalonymus Kalman Shapira of Piaseczno (b. 1889, killed at Trawniki, November 3, 1943), son of Rabbi Elimelech Szapira.
 Rabbi Isaiah, son of Rabbi Elimelech Szapira.
 Rabbi Elimelech, son of Rabbi Isaiah.
 Rabbi Kalman Menachem, son of Rabbi Elimelech - current Piaseczno-Grodzhisk Rebbe in Ramat Beit Shemesh

Hasidic dynasties of Poland
Orthodox Judaism in Poland